Dave McIntosh (4 May 1925 – 24 July 1995) was a Scottish professional football player who played for Sheffield Wednesday and Doncaster Rovers as a goalkeeper. McIntosh spent almost ten years at Sheffield Wednesday, playing a total of 308 games for the club.

References

1925 births
1995 deaths
People from Girvan
Scottish footballers
Sheffield Wednesday F.C. players
Doncaster Rovers F.C. players
English Football League players
Association football goalkeepers
Footballers from South Ayrshire